Saint-Germain-des-Essourts is a commune in the Seine-Maritime department in the Normandy region in northern France.

Geography
The commune's territory is the source of the river Crevon, a small tributary of the Andelle river.

Population

Places of interest
 The church of St. Germain, dating from the nineteenth century.
 A sixteenth-century stone cross.
 The nineteenth-century chateau of Fontaine-Châtel.
 The chateau of Bimare.
 The chapel of St. Austreberthe.

See also
Communes of the Seine-Maritime department

References

Communes of Seine-Maritime